Chuck Kyle (born September 25, 1947) is a former American football linebacker in the Canadian Football League for the Saskatchewan Roughriders. He played college football at Purdue University.

Early years
Kyle grew up in Fort Thomas, Kentucky. He attended Highlands High School, where he practiced football, shot put and also won a state diving championship.

He accepted a football scholarship from Purdue University. He was a three-year starter at the middle guard position. He was an All-Big Ten player in 1966 (UPI-1), 1967 (AP-1, UPI-1), and 1968 (AP-1, UPI-1).  He was also a consensus first-team selection as a middle guard on the 1968 College Football All-America Team.

Professional career
Kyle was selected by the Dallas Cowboys in the fifth round (125th overall) of the 1969 NFL draft. He was waived on September 15. 

He spent two seasons (1969, 1970) in the Canadian Football League as a member of the Saskatchewan Roughriders and appeared in the 57th Grey Cup.

On June 9, 1971, he was traded to the Montreal Alouettes in exchange for linebacker Charlie Collins. He was released on July 23.

On February 5, 1972, he was signed as a free agent by the New York Jets. He was waived injured on August 8.

References

1947 births
Living people
People from Fort Thomas, Kentucky
Players of American football from Kentucky
All-American college football players
American football linebackers
Purdue Boilermakers football players
Saskatchewan Roughriders players